The Polytechnic University of the Philippines Taguig (PUPT) is a satellite campus of the Polytechnic University of the Philippines located at Taguig, Philippines and was established on 1992. The site in which the campus sits was reserved exclusively for the use and disposition of the university through the proclamation of President Ferdinand Marcos on 1967.

Campus
The  campus of PUP Taguig is located at Lower Bicutan, Taguig. The site was reserved in 1967 through a Presidential Declaration, although development for the campus started in the 1990s, almost 30 years since the Presidential Declaration. Among the buildings and structures inside the campus are: the Marichu Rodriguez Tiñga Building, otherwise known as Building A; the Cayetano Building, which houses the Engineering Center; school's library, and the school's auditorium; the Students Center, otherwise known as Building B is where the offices of accredited organizations are located. The chemistry laboratory are also located within this building; the school's gymnasium; and the interfaith chapel. Other development in the campus includes the Zonta Park, the main and primary park and recreation area of the school.

Academic Programs

Undergraduate Programs

Degree Courses 

 Bachelor of Science in Electronics Engineering (BSECE)
 Bachelor of Science in Mechanical Engineering (BSME)
 Bachelor of Science in Accountancy (BSA)
 Bachelor of Science in Business Administration (BSBA) major in Human Resource Development Management, Marketing Management
 Bachelor of Science in Applied Mathematics (BSAM)
 Bachelor of Science in Information Technology (BSIT)
 Bachelor of Science in Entrepreneurship (BSENTREP)
 Bachelor in Secondary Education (BSED) major in English, Mathematics
 Bachelor of Science in Office Administration (BSOA)

Diploma Courses 

 Diploma in Information Communication Technology (DICT)
 Diploma in Office Management Technology (DOMT)

References

External links
 
 Polytechnic University of the Philippines – Official website

Polytechnic University of the Philippines
State universities and colleges in Metro Manila
Education in Taguig